Kidney associated antigen 1 is a protein that in humans is encoded by the KAAG1 gene.

References

Further reading